Ruadhán Quinn (born 17 October 2003) is an Irish rugby union player who is currently a member of Munster's academy as of the 2022–23 season. He plays in the back-row and represents Limerick club Old Crescent in the amateur All-Ireland League.

Early life and amateur rugby
Quinn was born in Dublin and first began playing rugby with Ballina-Killaloe RFC. He attended Crescent College and played for the school's rugby team, scoring a hat-trick of tries in Crescent's 17–15 win against Bandon Grammar School in the semi-finals of the 2022 Munster Schools Senior Cup, before the school defeated Presentation Brothers College 26–5 in the final to secure a twelfth Schools Senior Cup.

Munster
Quinn earned selection for the Munster under-19s during the 2021–22 season and entered year one of Munster's academy ahead of the 2022–23 season, straight after finishing school. A few days before getting his leaving cert results, Quinn made his non-competitive senior debut for Munster, appearing off the bench in the province's 28–19 defeat against English club Gloucester in a friendly on 26 August 2022 to replace Jack O'Sullivan, who'd left the field with a head injury in the 3rd minute.

Quinn made his senior competitive debut for Munster in their 2022–23 United Rugby Championship round three fixture against Italian club Zebre Parma on 1 October 2022, coming on in the 73rd minute as a replacement for Jack O'Sullivan in the province's 21–5 home win and in doing so becoming the youngest player to line out for Munster in a competitive fixture during the professional era, with Quinn being 18-years-old at the time.

Ireland
Quinn was selected in the Ireland under-19s squad for their double-header against France in April 2022, starting in both matches. He was selected in the Ireland under-20s squad for the 2023 Six Nations Under 20s Championship, starting and scoring one try in their opening round 44–27 away win against Wales on 3 February, before also starting in the 33–31 home win against France in round two on 10 February, the 44–27 away win against Italy in round three on 24 February, the 82–7 away win against Scotland on 10 March, in which Quinn scored a hat-trick of tries and earned the player of the match award, and the 36–24 win against England on 19 March that secured the grand slam for Ireland.

Honours

Crescent College
Munster Schools Senior Cup:
Winner (1): 2022

Ireland under-20s
Six Nations Under 20s Championship:
Winner (1): 2023
Grand Slam:
Winner (1): 2023
 Triple Crown:
 Winner (1): 2023

References

External links
Munster Academy Profile
All Rugby Profile
URC Profile

2003 births
Living people
Rugby union players from County Dublin
Rugby union players from Dublin (city)
Irish rugby union players
People educated at Crescent College
Munster Rugby players
Rugby union flankers
Rugby union number eights